Convoy JW 55B was an Arctic convoy sent from Great Britain by the Western Allies to aid the Soviet Union during World War II. It sailed in late December 1943, reaching the Soviet northern ports at the end of the month. All ships arrived safely.

During the voyage JW 55B was approached by a German force centred on the battleship ; no contact was made with the convoy, but Scharnhorst was sunk, in the Battle of the North Cape, by the battleship , a handful of Royal Navy light surface combatants, and Norwegian destroyer .

Ships
The convoy, comprising 19 merchant ships, departed Loch Ewe on 20 December 1943. Close escort was provided by two destroyers and three other escort vessels. There was also an Ocean escort, comprising the destroyer Onslow (Capt J A McCoy commanding) and seven other Home Fleet destroyers. The convoy was initially accompanied by a local escort group, and joined later by the ocean escort of convoy JW 55A, out of Murmansk. A cruiser cover force comprising Belfast (V Adm R Burnett commanding), Norfolk, and Sheffield also followed the convoy, to guard against attack by surface units. Distant cover was provided by a Heavy Cover Force comprising the battleship Duke of York, the cruiser Jamaica and four destroyers under the command of V Adm Bruce Fraser.

JW 55B was opposed by a force of thirteen U-boats in a patrol line, code-named Eisenbart, in the Norwegian Sea. A surface force comprising the battleship Scharnhorst and five destroyers was also in readiness, stationed at Altenfjord.

Action
JW 55B departed Loch Ewe on 20 December 1943 accompanied by its local escort of two minesweepers and two corvettes, and its close escort. Two days later on 22 December, it was joined by the ocean escort, while the local escort returned. At the same time the Cruiser Force, from Murmansk, and the Distant Cover Force, waiting at Akureyri, in Iceland, also put to sea, taking station in the Norwegian Sea. The convoy was sighted the same day by a patrolling German aircraft which commenced shadowing; a succession of aircraft were able to maintain contact over the next few days, sending accurate reports of course and speed to the surface force at Altenfjord.

On 25 December the convoy was sighted by U-601, an Eisenbart boat, and later that day Adm. Bey, in Scharnhorst, received permission to sortie with his force. That evening U-716 came close enough to fire on one of the escorts, while another was depth-charged. Also on 25 December, JW 55B was joined by the ocean escort of JW 55A, which was accompanying the returning convoy RA 55A.  Fraser was concerned a German surface force would reach JW 55B before he would, and ordered the convoy to reverse course. In the event this proved too difficult, but the convoy was slowed to 8 knots to assist the rendez-vous.

Scharnhorst was unable to make contact with JW 55B, but on 26 December was intercepted, first by Burnett's cruisers, then by Fraser's heavy units, and sunk in the Battle of the North Cape, after scoring only two minor hits on both Duke of York and destroyer . Meanwhile, contact by the U-boats had been lost, and no further contact with JW 55B was made by the Eisenbart wolf-pack.

On 28 December the convoy was met by the eastern local escort force, three Soviet destroyers and two minesweepers, and arrived at Kola without further incident on 30 December 1943.

Conclusion
The 19 ships of JW 55B arrived at Murmansk without loss, while the German attempt to attack the convoy had led to the loss of their last operational capital ship in Norway. Thereafter, until Tirpitz was returned to active service, the Allied Arctic convoys were under no serious threat from the German Navy's surface forces.

Ships involved

Allied ships

Axis ships

U-boat force
 U-314 
 U-354
 U-387
 U-601
 U-716
 U-957

Surface force
 Scharnhorst
 Z29
 Z30
 Z33
 Z34
 Z38

Notes

References
 Clay Blair : Hitler's U-Boat War [Volume 2]: The Hunted 1942–1945 (1998)  (2000 UK paperback ed.)
 Paul Kemp : Convoy! Drama in Arctic Waters (1993) 
 Paul Kemp  : U-Boats Destroyed  ( 1997) .  
 Axel Neistle  : German U-Boat Losses during World War II  (1998). 
 Bob Ruegg, Arnold Hague : Convoys to Russia (1992) 
 Bernard Schofield : (1964) The Russian Convoys BT Batsford  ISBN (none)
  JW 55B at Convoyweb

JW 55B
Naval battles of World War II involving Canada
C